Emanuele Gaetani Liseo (born 22 November 1996) is an Italian rower who won a bronze medal at the 2022 European Rowing Championships.

References

External links
 

1996 births
Living people
Italian male rowers
21st-century Italian people
20th-century Italian people